The 2000 Ulster Unionist Party leadership election was triggered by the decision of Martin Smyth to challenge incumbent David Trimble over the party's direction in the implementation of the Belfast Agreement at the party's annual general meeting on 25 March 2000. Reverend Smyth, the Member of Parliament (MP) for South Belfast who was opposed to the Good Friday Agreement, made the move after Trimble indicated that he was prepared to re-establish Northern Ireland's power-sharing executive, working with Sinn Féin ahead of I.R.A. disarmament.

Smyth had run against Trimble for leadership before in 1995 after James Molyneaux stepped down.

The UUP has held a leadership election every March since at least the Ulster Unionist Council constitution was altered in 1973, however it is rarely contested.  This is one of the few occasions when it has been contested.

The election was decided by delegates to the Ulster Unionist Council. After one round of voting Trimble retained his leadership. In spite of winning the election, Trimble's reduced support was perceived as damaging his authority as well as the Peace process in general.

Candidates

Martin Smyth, MP for Belfast South and former Grand Master of the Orange Order
David Trimble, MP for Upper Bann and sitting leader

Results

David Trimble was re-elected.

Smyth retired from the House of Commons in 2005; Trimble lost his seat in the election of that year but was made a life peer in 2006.

References

 "Trimble narrowly wins leadership challenge" BBC On This Day

Ulster Unionist Party leadership elections
2000 elections in the United Kingdom
2000 elections in Northern Ireland
Ulster Unionist Party leadership election